Gönüllü is a village in the Gercüş District of Batman Province in Turkey. The village had a population of 357 in 2021.

The village plants rice.

History 
It had a population of 201 in 1935.

References 

Villages in Gercüş District
Kurdish settlements in Batman Province